Parliamentary elections were held in Austria on 5 October 1975. The result was a victory for the Socialist Party, which won 93 of the 183 seats. Voter turnout was 93%.

Results

References

Elections in Austria
Austria
Legislative
Austria